Rick Mofina is a Canadian author of crime fiction and thriller novels. He grew up in Belleville, Ontario and began writing short stories in school. He sold his first short story at the age of fifteen. As a member of the Mystery Writers of America, the International Thriller Writers, the International Crime Writers Association, and the Crime Writers' Association and Crime Writers of Canada, Rick continues to be a featured panelist at mystery conferences across the United States and Canada.

Mofina began writing at the age of 18, inspired by a hitchhiking trip down to California from his home town of Belleville. Although he wrote a novel about his experiences it was never published.

Journalism career
He attended Carleton University studying Journalism, English Literature, and American Detective Fiction. He was a summer student rookie reporter at The Toronto Star, the same paper that once employed Ernest Hemingway, before embarking on a career in journalism that spanned three decades and several newsrooms, including The Ottawa Citizen, The Calgary Herald and the national bureaus for Newswire services, Southam News, and CanWest. His freelance crime stories have appeared around the world in such publications as The New York Times, Reader’s Digest, Marie Claire, The South China Morning Post magazine and The Moscow Times. He has also written for the UK’s Sunday Telegraph.

His reporting has put him face-to-face with murderers on death row in Montana and Texas. He covered a horrific serial killing case in California, an armored car heist in Las Vegas, the murders of police officers in Alberta, flown over Los Angeles with the LAPD, and gone on patrol with the Royal Canadian Mounted Police near the Arctic. He has reported from the Caribbean, Africa and the Middle East.

Novels
His first novel If Angels Fall was published in 2000 and introduced San Francisco Star crime reporter Tom Reed and San Francisco Homicide Inspector Walt Sydowski. It was a Best First Novel finalist for an Arthur Ellis Award from the Crime Writers of Canada. His second Reed-Sydowski book is Cold Fear. With that book, Quill & Quire said Rick, “Positions himself high in the suspense genre saddle.” It was followed by Blood Of Others, which #1 New York Times bestselling author James Patterson praised as, “Tense, realistic, and scary in all the right places.” The Ottawa Citizen described Rick as “A writer clearly destined for literary stardom,” while Penthouse said he was, “One of the leading thriller writers of the day.” The Globe & Mail said Rick was becoming one of Canada’s favorite crime writers. Blood Of Others won the Arthur Ellis Award for Best Novel in 2003.

No Way Back, the fourth Reed-Sydowski book, was released in 2003 and praised by Michael Connelly as being, “My kind of novel — a tough, taut thriller.” It was followed in 2004 by Be Mine, the fifth in the series. Dean Koontz said, Rick was writing, “A fine series of thrillers to which Be Mine is a great addition: swiftly paced, entertaining, with authentic details of police procedure.”

After five books — and movie options on If Angels Fall and Cold Fear, which have since expired — the Reed-Sydowski series went on hiatus and Rick launched a new series featuring Jason Wade, a rookie crime reporter based in Seattle, for that book he drew upon his own experiences at The Toronto Star and later, The Calgary Herald. The series debuted in the summer of 2005 with The Dying Hour, which climbed to #7 on Canada’s best seller list (Quill & Quire) and hit #1 among Wal-Mart Canada’s best sellers. Sandra Brown, an acclaimed international best-selling author, told Rick that she loved The Dying Hour. “It starts scary and ends scary.”

The second book in the Jason Wade series is Every Fear, which features a story that “Pushes crackling suspense to the breaking point and beyond,” according to New York Times bestselling author Kay Hooper. Rick’s third Jason Wade book is A Perfect Grave, which New York Times bestselling author Tess Gerritsen called, “A lightning-paced thriller with lean, tense writing.”

Rick followed A Perfect Grave with his first standalone book, the global thriller Six Seconds. For that book, Rick drew heavily on his international assignments as a newspaper reporter and his time as a wire service reporter. Six Seconds became a bestseller in the US, the UK and Canada, and has drawn praise from around the world. It was published in 12 countries and 7 languages, including German, Danish, Finnish, and Polish.

After Six Seconds, Rick's first stand alone global thriller, he launched a new series featuring crime reporter Jack Gannon, who is introduced in Vengeance Road. Upon its release in Australia, the county's largest circulation magazine, The Australian Women's Weekly said of the book: "It's a ripper - 10 out of 10 for intensity!" Vengeance Road was followed by The Panic Zone, In Desperation and The Burning Edge. To date, the Jack Gannon series, has received two award nominations (Vengeance Road and The Panic Zone) for a Shamus, from the Private Eye Writers of America and a Thriller Award nomination (Vengeance Road) from the International Thriller Writers, and a Thriller of the Year, Reviewers' Choice Award (The Burning Edge) from RT Magazine.

Rick followed The Burning Edge, with the acclaimed stand alone thriller, They Disappeared. In its review of They Disappeared, which became a best seller, Library Journal said: "Rick Mofina is one of the best thriller writers in the business."

They Disappeared was followed by another stand alone thriller, Into the Dark.

The popularity of Rick’s books continues to grow around the world. His titles have been now published in more than 20 countries and have been praised by James Patterson, Dean Koontz, Michael Connelly, Lee Child, Tess Gerritsen, Jeffery Deaver, Sandra Brown, James Rollins, Brad Thor, Nick Stone, David Morrell, Allison Brennan, Heather Graham, Linwood Barclay, Peter Robinson, Håkan Nesser and Kay Hooper.

Rick is currently writing more books.

He has appeared regularly on the TV documentary series True Pulp Murder as a guest novelist.

Works

Tom Reed and Walt Sydowski Series 
 If Angels Fall (2000) Finalist for an Arthur Ellis Award 
 Cold Fear (2001) Finalist for an Arthur Ellis Award
 Blood of Others (2002) Winner of the Arthur Ellis Award
 No Way Back (2003)
 Be Mine (2004)

Jason Wade Series 
 The Dying Hour (2005) Finalist International Thriller Award
 Every Fear (2006) Best Reads, Spinetingler Magazine
 A Perfect Grave (2007) Spinetingler Rising Star Award Finalist

Jack Gannon Series 
 Vengeance Road (2009) Finalist Shamus Award and International Thriller Award
 The Panic Zone (2010) Finalist Shamus Award
 In Desperation (2011) RTBook Reviews - Reviewers’ Choice Best Book Award
 The Burning Edge (2011)

Kate Page Series 
 Whirlwind (2014) Finalist International Thriller Award
 Full Tilt (2015)
 Every Second (2015)
 Free Fall (2016)

Standalone Novels 
 Six Seconds (2008)
 They Disappeared (2012) A Best Thriller of 2012 Selection - Library Journal
 Into the Dark (2013)
 The Only Human (2014)
 Before Sunrise (2016) (short Novel)
 Last Seen (2018)
 Missing Daughter (2019) Winner Barry Award
 The Lying House (2019)
 Their Last Secret (2020)
 Search for Her (2021)
 Her Last Goodbye (2022)

Short Story Collections 
 Dangerous Women & Desperate Men (2011)
 Three to the Heart (2012)
 Day of the Bone Thief (2013)

Short Stories 
 Lightning Rider (2011) Winner Arthur Ellis Award
 Blood Red Rings (2011)
 Three Bullets to Queensland (2011)
 As Long As We Both Shall Live (2011) Finalist Arthur Ellis Award
 The Last Pursuit (2012)
 A Lifetime Burning in a Moment (2012)
 Backup (2012) Finalist Arthur Ellis Award &  International Thriller Award

External links
 Rick Mofina

References

"The shadow of James M. Cain hangs over every page." - Daily Mail, London
Rick Mofina

Living people
Canadian crime fiction writers
Canadian mystery writers
Canadian male short story writers
Journalists from Ontario
Writers from Belleville, Ontario
Carleton University alumni
21st-century Canadian short story writers
21st-century Canadian male writers
Canadian thriller writers
Canadian male non-fiction writers
1957 births